Rogelio Concepcion Morales (November 5, 1920 – February 19, 1994) was a Filipino master mariner, educator, Navy captain, and activist best known for his role in the transformation of the Nautical School of the Philippines/Philippine Nautical School into the modern-day Philippine Merchant Marine Academy, and for his activism to promote  the rights of Filipino seafarers, which led him to become the president of various advocacy societies and unions through the 1950s and 1960s, and to become founder of the Concerned Seamen of the Philippines (CSP) in 1983.

Legacy
In November 2012, Morales was among 12 individuals honored by having their named engraved on the Wall of Remembrance of the Bantayog ng mga Bayani, which honors the martyrs and heroes who fought against the Marcos Dictatorship.  Because of his maritime background, he developed a close relationship with Philippine Military Academy instructor Dante Simbulan, Navy Capt. Danilo Vizmanos and Polytechnic University of the Philippines President Nemesio Prudente, who all shared Morales' advocacies; the latter two are fellow Bantayog ng mga Bayani honorees.

References 

Marcos martial law victims
Individuals honored at the Bantayog ng mga Bayani
Military personnel honored at the Bantayog ng mga Bayani
1920 births
1994 deaths